"If It Makes You Happy" is a song by American singer-songwriter Sheryl Crow, released as the lead single from her 1996 eponymous album in September 1996. The song peaked at number 10 on the US Billboard Hot 100, becoming Crow's final top-10 solo hit in the United States, and at number nine on the UK Singles Chart. It also reached number one in Canada and won Best Female Rock Vocal Performance at the 1997 Grammy Awards. In 2003, Q Magazine ranked "If It Makes You Happy" at number 663 in their list of the "1001 Best Songs Ever".

Chart performance
The song entered the US Billboard Hot 100 at number 44 on the week of September 21, 1996. It entered the top 20 on October 19, 1996, and fluctuated within the top 20 for roughly three months before reaching its peak of number 10 on January 25, 1997. The song spent a total of 27 weeks on the Hot 100. In Canada, on September 2, 1996, "If It Makes You Happy" debuted at number 78 on the RPM Top Singles chart. Ten issues later, on November 11, it topped the chart for a single week. It also reached number one on RPMs Adult Contemporary and Alternative 30 listings.

In Europe, the single debuted and peaked at number nine on the UK Singles Chart, becoming Crow's second top-ten single in the United Kingdom. The British Phonographic Industry certified the song silver in January 2021 for sales and streaming figures of over 200,000. It reached the top 40 in France, Iceland, and Sweden, reaching numbers 29, 17, and 20, respectively, and also charted in Flanders, Germany, and Switzerland. On the Eurochart Hot 100, "If It Makes You Happy" settled at a peak of number 56. It additionally reached the top 20 in Australia, rising to number 20 on November 17, 1996, and in New Zealand, where it peaked at number 12 one week later.

Critical reception
"If It Makes You Happy" received positive reviews from music critics. Scottish Aberdeen Press and Journal stated that Sheryl Crow "continues to stay near the top of the premier league of slightly off the-wall female solo singers with what seems a near-certain Top 10 hit." Swedish Aftonbladet described the song as "shuffling trad-rock". Stephen Thomas Erlewine from AllMusic called it "weary" and "sexily exhausted". Larry Flick from Billboard magazine stated that it is a "straight-ahead rocker that has far more bite than anything on her Grammy-lavished debut." He added that "seemingly endless touring has given her voice a sharp rasp, which benefits the song's ironic lyrics and holds up strong against the track's crunchy guitars." He also noted the track's "edgy nature" and "subtle but unmistakable hook." 

Daina Darzin from Cash Box viewed it as "an appropriately plain, anthemic song with the universally-appealing hook, "if it makes you happy, it can't be that bad", adding, "Fans who usually shop Wal-Mart will be looking for a new record store with this one, so retailers should stock lots and lots." The Daily Vault's Sean McCarthy remarked that here, a "dirty guitar riff is established, complimenting Crow's gritty swagger." Another Swedish newspaper, Göteborgs-Tidningen called it "darkly moody", picking it as one of two favourites from the album. Rachel Cohen from The Heights felt "the familiar more expressive Crow of the first album is evident" on the song, declaring it as "one of the most peppy" on the Sheryl Crow album. A reviewer from Music Week rated it five out of five and named it Single of the Week, noting that it "captures the raunchy rawk'n'roll feel of Crow's live sets. Though some may miss the fragility of her debut, this is good enough to shift bucketloads and is already winning airplay." People magazine described the song as "country-tinged". David Fricke from Rolling Stone said that "If It Makes You Happy" "is as good as it gets, juicing the feel of Tuesday Night with a little Friday night fire."

Music video
Two different music videos for the song were made; both were directed by Keir McFarlane.  The first was shot entirely in black-and-white. It begins with Crow in an apartment, donning a black raincoat. She then walks down a city street, rides a subway, is shown on a boardwalk, buys coffee at a mall, and then returns to the apartment. The second video was shot in color and features Crow in the Endangered Species section of the Natural History Museum of Los Angeles County. She is dressed in a leopard-print fur coat and Yves Saint Laurent leather boots.

Impact and legacy
Q Magazine placed "If It Makes You Happy" at number 663 in their list of the "1001 Best Songs Ever" in 2003. Slant Magazine listed it at number 92 in their ranking of "The 100 Best Singles of the 1990s" in 2011, writing, "After allegations that she was simply a pretty mouthpiece for her Tuesday Night Music Club, Sheryl Crow had a lot to prove with her sophomore effort. Originally conceived as a country song by co-writer Jeff Trott, the self-produced lead single, 'If It Makes You Happy', was a pointed departure from the gin-soaked roots-pop of Tuesday Night Music Club, starting with its heavy electric guitar riff and plodding drum beat, but not ending there. Crow's lyrics are a reflection on the massive success of her debut, with her stint at the muddy, mosquito-ridden Woodstock '94 festival serving as a metaphorical narrative for the stinging accusations and acrimony that followed."

Track listings

 US CD and cassette single
 "If It Makes You Happy" (edit)
 "Keep On Growing"

 US maxi-CD single
 "If It Makes You Happy" (LP version) – 5:23
 "Keep On Growing" – 5:24
 "I'm Going to Be a Wheel Someday" – 3:38
 "No One Said It Would Be Easy" (Live in Nashville) – 5:37

 US 7-inch single
A. "If It Makes You Happy" (edit) – 4:30
B. "I'm Going to Be a Wheel Someday" – 3:38

 UK CD1 and cassette single
 "If It Makes You Happy" (edit)
 "All I Wanna Do"
 "Run Baby Run"
 "Leaving Las Vegas"

 UK CD2
 "If It Makes You Happy" – 4:30
 "On the Outside" – 4:42
 "Keep On Growing" – 5:24
 "The Book" – 4:34
Note: The Australian CD single switches tracks two and three.

Credits and personnel
Credits are lifted from the UK CD1 liner notes and the Sheryl Crow album booklet.

Studios
 Recorded at Kingsway Studios (New Orleans) and Sunset Sound Factory (Los Angeles)
 Mastered at Gateway Mastering (Portland, Maine, US)

Personnel

 Sheryl Crow – writing, keyboard, production
 Jeff Trott – writing, guitars
 Dan Rothchild – bass
 Michael Urbano – drums

 Trina Shoemaker – recording
 Tchad Blake – mixing
 Bob Ludwig – mastering

Charts and certifications

Weekly charts

Year-end charts

Decade-end charts

Certifications

Release history

See also
 List of RPM number-one singles of 1996 (Canada)
 List of RPM Rock/Alternative number-one singles (Canada)

References

External links
 

1996 singles
1996 songs
A&M Records singles
Black-and-white music videos
Grammy Award for Best Female Rock Vocal Performance
Music videos directed by Keir McFarlane
RPM Top Singles number-one singles
Sheryl Crow songs
Songs written by Jeff Trott
Songs written by Sheryl Crow